The Macau Daily Times is one of the two daily English-language newspapers published in Macau, launched on June 1, 2007.

Overview 
The paper started life among one English and several Chinese and Portuguese language newspapers. It consists of between 20 and 36 pages. Currently more than 30 journalists and contributors are working with the paper which includes a director, managing editor, contributing editors, reporters and designers.

The newspaper, like all press in Macau (and Hong Kong), are protected by the Basic Law and Press Law, which upholds the freedom of the press in the enclave and restricting government regulation of the media. Journalists can protect their sources of information. An editorial on the website claims that the paper "is an independent and unbiased newspaper that voices every side's opinion'. 

Since March 1, 2012, Paulo Coutinho, an award-winning journalist with a career over 25 years in television, magazines and newspapers, is the director and editor-in-chief. Kowie Geldenhuys is the founder and administrator of the Macau Daily Times.

See also
 Media of Macau

References

External links

 

Newspapers published in Macau
2007 establishments in Macau